Mylothris elodina is a butterfly in the family Pieridae. It is found in Cameroon, Gabon, Angola and the Democratic Republic of Congo.

Subspecies
Mylothris elodina elodina (Cameroon, Gabon)
Mylothris elodina diva Berger, 1954 (Angola, the Democratic Republic of Congo)
Mylothris elodina pelenge Berger, 1981 (Democratic Republic of Congo: Shaba)

References

Butterflies described in 1944
Pierini